Adam Miller (born November 21, 1984) is an American professional ice hockey player. He is currently playing with Frederikshavn White Hawks of the Metal Ligaen.

In 2008, following four years at Ferris State University, the Las Vegas Wranglers of the ECHL signed Miller to an amateur try-out agreement. In the 2008–09 season, Miller played 54 regular-season games and 18 playoff games with the Wranglers, and also skated in 10 games with the Milwaukee Admirals of the American Hockey League (AHL). During 2009–10, he played 77 games with the Wranglers, and won the Reebok fastest skater competition at the 2010 ECHL All-Star Game skills competition.

Miller played the 2010-11 season in the Finnish SM-liiga and Swedish Allsvenskan leagues. He returned to the Wranglers for the following 2011–12 season, before returning to Europe in played with Croatian club, KHL Medveščak Zagreb participating in the Austrian EBEL.

After a single season in the Asia League Ice Hockey with the Nippon Paper Cranes, Miller opted for a second stint in the EBEL, agreeing to terms on a one-year deal with Dornbirner EC on June 19, 2014.

References

External links 

1984 births
Ässät players
Des Moines Buccaneers players
Dornbirn Bulldogs players
Ferris State Bulldogs men's ice hockey players
Frederikshavn White Hawks players
IF Troja/Ljungby players
KHL Medveščak Zagreb players
Las Vegas Wranglers players
Living people
Milwaukee Admirals players
Nippon Paper Cranes players
Sportspeople from Livonia, Michigan
American men's ice hockey centers